Cheong-Chua Koon Hean (born 1957) is a Singaporean urban planner and architect.

Biography 
Cheong is a Colombo Plan scholar with a first class degree in architecture at Newcastle University in 1981. Cheong completed a master's degree in Urban Development Planning from the University College London, and did a six-week Advanced Management Programme at Harvard Business School. She received an honorary doctorate of architecture from the University of Newcastle in 2010.

Cheong started working as a public servant in 1984. Cheong was the CEO of the Urban Redevelopment Authority (URA) between 2004 and 2010 where she was in charge of various areas, such as conservation of historic buildings and real estate. The Straits Times wrote that her work as CEO of URA played "a key role in developing Singapore into a distinctive global city." She also was the first woman to head the URA. From 2010 to 2020, she had been the CEO of the Housing and Development Board in Singapore.

Cheong received a Gold Public Administration medal in 2005 and a silver Public Administration medal in 1997. In 2010, Cheong was awarded the Her World Woman of the Year award. In 2014, Cheong was inducted into the Singapore Women's Hall of Fame.

References 

1957 births
Living people
Singaporean people of Chinese descent
Alumni of University College London
Singaporean architects
Singaporean women architects
University of Newcastle (Australia) alumni
Singaporean urban planners
Women chief executives
Recipients of the Pingat Pentadbiran Awam